"Thieves Like Us" is a single by British band New Order, released in April 1984 by Factory Records, catalogue number FAC 103. It is named after the 1974 film Thieves Like Us, directed by Robert Altman. Guitarist and lead singer Bernard Sumner stated during a TV interview in 1984 that the song's title was suggested by John Benitez (an associate of the song's co-writer, Arthur Baker).

The B-side is "Lonesome Tonight". Both tracks appear on the group's 1987 Substance compilation, and on the 2008 Collectors Edition of Power, Corruption & Lies, as well as the extended instrumental version of "Thieves Like Us" (originally the B-side to "Murder").

Like many of their releases, the record was produced by the band, although "Thieves Like Us" was co-written by Arthur Baker during the New York sessions for "Confusion".

An instrumental version of the song is featured in the 1986 movie Pretty in Pink.

The single's cover design by Peter Saville is based on a metaphysical painting by Giorgio de Chirico and the 19th century English board game The New and Fashionable Game of the Jew. It forms a set with their next single, "Murder".

Track listing

Released in Poland under licence of Factory Records, 1985

Chart positions

References

3. Sumner, Bernard. Pop Elektron. Belgium TV. 28-5-1984.

New Order (band) songs
1984 singles
Songs written by Bernard Sumner
Songs written by Peter Hook
Songs written by Stephen Morris (musician)
Songs written by Gillian Gilbert
Songs written by Arthur Baker (musician)
Factory Records singles
1984 songs
UK Independent Singles Chart number-one singles